{{DISPLAYTITLE:C16H28O}}
The molecular formula C16H28O (molar mass: 236.39 g/mol, exact mass: 236.2140 u) may refer to:

 Ambroxide
 Isobornyl cyclohexanol (IBCH)
 5-Cyclohexadecenone

Molecular formulas